Wilson Dam is the name of several dams:

India
Wilson Dam (Pravara River)

United States
Wilson Dam (Alabama)
Wilson Dam (Huerfano County, Colorado)
Wilson Dam (Moffat County, Colorado)
Wilson Dam (Rio Blanco County, Colorado)
Wilson Dam (Teller County, Colorado)
Wilson Dam (Georgia)
Wilson Dam (Kansas)
Wilson Dam (Missouri)
Wilson Dam (Montana)
Wilson Dam (North Dakota)
Wilson Dam (Nebraska)
Wilson Dam (Oregon)
Wilson Dam (Pennsylvania)
Wilson Dam (South Dakota)
Wilson Dam (Texas)
Wilson Dam (Virginia)